Ostrovskaya is a rural locality (a stanitsa) and the administrative center of Ostrovskoye Rural Settlement, Danilovsky District, Volgograd Oblast, Russia. The population was 1,689 as of 2010. There are 26 streets.

Geography 
Ostrovskaya is located in forest steppe, 45 km northeast of Danilovka (the district's administrative centre) by road. Orekhovo is the nearest rural locality.

References 

Rural localities in Danilovsky District, Volgograd Oblast